Federation II was a free-to-play online text-based game also known as Federation 2 or Fed2. It was designed by British programmer Alan Lenton and developed by IBGames. It centers on the intergalactic trade and economy in the distant future. It is coded in C++

History 

In July 1987 Compunet had announced the return of MUD and a new multi-user game Federation II. Fed began as a single-player bulletin board demo, but gained popularity. The Adventure 87 Convention demonstrated the multi-user form, which was expected to run by that Christmas. After many delays, it officially opened on January 10, 1988 as the first MUD to have a non-fantasy setting.

In 1990, Federation II moved to GEnie and caused confusion as 'II' was assumed to mean the game was a sequel when in reality there was never a "Federation I". The "II" was slowly dropped. In speaking back about that period, it is generally referred to as GEnie/Aries Fed.

AOL Federation began testing in May 1995 and published the following month. Open beta began on June 21 which allowed AOL players in the game for the first time.

AOL had changed its billing structure over the years, which affected Fed and its users. At the beginning of 1997, AOL moved to flat rate pricing which caused a dramatic spike in Fed players. AOL later wanted to cut ties with Federation, forcing the game to move to the web. Federation on AOL officially closed in August of 1997.

The backups of Fed files from AOL were available for a brief time to allow users to migrate their characters to Web Fed, but were deleted in December of that same year.

In October Web Fed went into beta testing. FedTerm Loaded, a new front-end program was released in December 1997, and the game came out of beta testing. By January 1998, the last traces of Fed had been removed from AOL.

In the end of November 2003, a disk drive failed on the Federation server causing the site to go down. Although Lenton was able to get the game back up and running, it could not be relied upon for long-term use. Work began on Fed 2 in December, named so as a homage to the original version on Compunet.  On the morning of Christmas 2003, Fed2 officially went live. 

On Sunday, 2 September 2018, game staff announced that the game would close on 1 October 2018.

Reception
Computer Gaming World in 1992 praised the social aspects of Federation II, stating that "the real center of the Federation universe is ... Chez Diesel". The magazine concluded that the game was "a marvelous social environment that uses simple, text-based game mechanics as an excuse to have an on-line party ... it's a cyburb where I wouldn't mind living". 

In a survey later that year of science fiction games the magazine gave the game three-plus stars of five, and a 1994 survey of strategic space games set in the year 2000 and later gave the game three stars out of five. 

In a September 1995 article in Computer Gaming World, during the beta test phase of AOL Fed, Wyatt Lee referred to Federation as “one of the wildest cyburbs in the telegaming universe”, calling it “one of the most 'real' imaginary universes you can visit”. In December of the same year, Electronic Entertainment published a review, calling Federation “The mother of multiplayer titles” with “Just about everything the power hungry could want”.

References

Sources
 "Fed's First Years"
 "Fed Archives"
 "Alan Lenton's Web Site"

External links
Federation II - The official site with news, downloads, maps, manuals, and a game archives.
Federation 2 Community Edition – Federation 2 Community Edition Official Site

Massively multiplayer online games
MUD games
2003 video games
Video games developed in the United Kingdom
Video games with textual graphics
Online text-based role-playing games
Free online games
Massively multiplayer online role-playing games
Multiplayer online games
Role-playing video games
Fantasy video games